The Canton of Saint-Vaury is a canton situated in the Creuse département and in the Nouvelle-Aquitaine region of central France.

Geography 
An area of farming, forestry and lakes in the arrondissement of Guéret, centred on the town of Saint-Vaury. The altitude varies from 254m (Anzême) to 683m (Saint-Léger-le-Guérétois) with an average altitude of 422m.

Population

Composition 
At the French canton reorganisation which came into effect in March 2015, the canton was expanded from 9 to 11 communes:
Ajain
Anzême
La Brionne
Bussière-Dunoise
Gartempe
Glénic
Jouillat
Saint-Fiel
Saint-Léger-le-Guérétois
Saint-Sulpice-le-Guérétois
Saint-Vaury

See also 
 Arrondissements of the Creuse department
 Cantons of the Creuse department
 Communes of the Creuse department

References

Saint-Vaury